Hermann Emil Louis Fischer  (9 October 1852 – 15 July 1919) was a German chemist and 1902 recipient of the Nobel Prize in Chemistry. He discovered the Fischer esterification. He also developed the Fischer projection, a symbolic way of drawing asymmetric carbon atoms. He also hypothesized lock and key mechanism of enzyme action. He never used his first given name, and was known throughout his life simply as Emil Fischer.

Early years and career
Fischer was born in Euskirchen, near Cologne, the son of Laurenz Fischer, a businessman, and his wife Julie Poensgen. After graduating he wished to study natural sciences, but his father compelled him to work in the family business until determining that his son was unsuitable. Fischer then attended the University of Bonn in 1871, but switched to the University of Strasbourg in 1872. He earned his doctorate in 1874 under Adolf von Baeyer with his study of phthaleins, and was appointed to a position at the university.

In 1875 von Baeyer was asked to succeed Justus von Liebig at the University of Munich and Fischer went there with him to become an assistant in organic chemistry. In 1878 Fischer qualified as a "Privatdozent" at Munich, where he was appointed associate professor of analytical chemistry in 1879.

In 1882 he was appointed professor of chemistry at the University of Erlangen and in 1885 at the University of Würzburg. In 1892 he succeeded von Hofmann as professor of chemistry at the University of Berlin.

Fischer married Agnes Gerlach in 1888. She died seven years later, leaving him a widower with three sons. The younger two died during their military service in World War I, but the oldest, Hermann, became an organic chemist. He died in Berlin on July 15, 1919 at the age of 66.

Research
In 1875, the year following his engagement with von Baeyer, he published his discovery of the organic derivatives of a new compound of hydrogen and nitrogen, hydrazine. He investigated their derivatives, establishing their relation to the diazo compounds, and he noted the readiness with which they entered into combination with other substances, giving origin to a wealth of hitherto unknown compounds. Of such condensation products undoubtedly the most important are the hydrazones, which result from the interaction with aldehydes and ketones. His observations, published in 1886, that such hydrazones, by treatment with hydrochloric acid or zinc chloride, yielded derivatives of indole, the parent substance of indigo, were a confirmation of the views advanced by von Baeyer on the subject of indigo and the many substances related to it.

He next turned to the fuchsine (then called "rosaniline") magenta dyes, and in collaboration with his cousin Otto Fischer, he published papers in 1878 and 1879 which established that these dyes were derivatives of triphenylmethane. Emil Fischer's next research was concerned with compounds related to uric acid. Here the ground had been broken by von Baeyer, but Fischer greatly advanced the field of knowledge of the purines. In 1881 and 1882 he published papers which established the formulae of uric acid, xanthine, caffeine (achieving the first synthesis), theobromine and some other compounds of this group. After purine itself was isolated, a variety of derivatives were prepared, some of which were patented in view of possible therapeutical applications.

Fischer is particularly noted for his work on sugars. Among his early discoveries related to hydrazine was that phenylhydrazine reacted with sugars to form substances which he named osazones, and which, being highly crystalline and readily formed, served to identify such carbohydrates more definitely than had been previously possible. Later, among other work, he is noted for the organic synthesis of D-(+)-glucose. He showed how to deduce the formulae of the 16 stereoisomeric glucoses, and prepared several stereoisomerides, helping to confirm the Le Bel–Van 't Hoff rule of the asymmetric carbon atom.

In the field of enzymology, Fischer is known for his proposal of "the lock and key" model as a mechanism of substrate binding.

Fischer was also instrumental in the discovery of barbiturates, a class of sedative drugs used for insomnia, epilepsy, anxiety, and anesthesia. Along with the physician Josef von Mering, he helped to launch the first barbiturate sedative, barbital, in 1904. He next carried out pioneering work on proteins. By the introduction of new methods, he succeeded in breaking down the complex albumins into amino acids and other nitrogenous compounds, the constitutions of most of which were known, and by bringing about the recombination of these units, he prepared synthetic peptides which approximated to the natural products. His researches made from 1899 to 1906 were published in 1907 with the title Untersuchungen über Aminosauren, Polypeptides und Proteine.

Honours, awards, and legacy

In 1897 he put forward the idea to create the International Atomic Weights Commission. Fischer was elected a Foreign Member of the Royal Society (ForMemRS) in 1899. He was awarded the 1902 Nobel Prize in chemistry "in recognition of the extraordinary services he has rendered by his work on sugar and purine syntheses."

Many names of chemical reactions and concepts are named after him:

 Fischer indole synthesis
 Fischer projection
 Fischer oxazole synthesis
 Fischer peptide synthesis
 Fischer phenylhydrazine and oxazone reaction
 Fischer–Speier esterification
 Fischer glycosidation
 Kiliani–Fischer synthesis

The Fischer–Tropsch process is named after Franz Emil Fischer, who headed the Max Planck Institute for Coal Research in Muelheim, and is unrelated to Fischer.

References

"From My Life", an English translation of "Aus Meinem Leben", Emil Fischer's autobiography.  D. M. and E. J. Behrman, Springer Verlag, 2022.

External links
  including his Nobel Lecture Nobel Lecture, December 12, 1902 Syntheses in the Purine and Sugar Group
 Eminent Chemists of Our Time By Benjamin Harrow pages 216–239, published 1920 by Von Nostrand Company at books.google.com.
 
 Guide to the Emil Fischer Papers at The Bancroft Library
 Text-book of Physiological Chemistry in Thirty Lectures by Emil Abderhalden, translated by William Thomas Hall and George Defren; published 1908 by Wiley Company, has many technical references to Fischer's work in Chemistry.
 American Journal of Diseases of Children 1911 volume 2 by the American Medical Association also refers to Fischer's work.
 An Introduction to the History of Medicine: With Medical Chronology by Fielding Hudson Garrison, page 708 refers to Fischer and Merings discovery of the drugs veronal(1904) and proponal(1905), published 1921 by Saunders Company.
 1914 Year Book of the American Pharmaceutical Association, page 438 abstracts Fischer and Strauss's work on Phenol-Glucosides – Synthetic Production from Berlin d.D Chem. Germany, page 45(1912) No. 12.
 

 
1852 births
1919 suicides
19th-century German chemists
20th-century German chemists
People from Euskirchen
Carbohydrate chemistry
German biochemists
German Nobel laureates
Nobel laureates in Chemistry
Organic chemists
Stereochemists
Academic staff of the University of Erlangen-Nuremberg
People from the Rhine Province
Academic staff of the Humboldt University of Berlin
Suicides in Germany
University of Bonn alumni
Foreign Members of the Royal Society
Foreign associates of the National Academy of Sciences
Recipients of the Pour le Mérite (civil class)
Members of the Royal Society of Sciences in Uppsala